Greenridge-Arthur Williams House is a historic mansion located at Roslyn Harbor in Nassau County, New York, United States.  It is a large, -story, Jacobethan Revival–style house constructed of concrete and faced in red brick.  It features a steeply pitched slate roof with projecting bays, gables, dormers, and deep eaves.  A 2-story gable-roofed Great Hall wing has a stone clad foundation and terminates in a five-sided bay to the north.  Also on the property is a contributing former ice house.

It was added to the National Register of Historic Places in 1999.

References

Houses on the National Register of Historic Places in New York (state)
Houses completed in 1916
Houses in Nassau County, New York
National Register of Historic Places in Nassau County, New York